Oenothera triloba, with common names stemless evening primrose and sessile evening primrose is a flowering plant in the primrose family. It is native to North America, where it is primarily found in northern Mexico and in the south-central United States. It is found in dry, open areas such as glades, prairies, and sometimes even lawns. It appears to respond positively to soil disturbance.

It is a winter annual that produces large yellow flowers in the spring. The flowers open near sunset.

Uses
Among the Zuni people, the plant is used as an ingredient of "schumaakwe cakes" and used externally for rheumatism and swelling. They also grind the roots and use them as food.

References

triloba
Flora of the South-Central United States
Flora of the North-Central United States
Flora of the Eastern United States
Flora of Mexico
Plants used in Native American cuisine
Plants used in traditional Native American medicine
Plants described in 1821
Flora without expected TNC conservation status